The Alliance for Mexico is the name of two multi-party electoral alliances in Mexico, one from 2000 and the other from 2006.

2000 elections
In the 2000 general election, Alliance for Mexico was a grouping of the Party of the Democratic Revolution, the Labor Party, the Party of the Nationalist Society, Convergence for the Democracy (founded by ex-PRI dissidents) and the Party of Social Action (founded by remnants of the Mexican synarchist movement). Cuauhtémoc Cárdenas ran as its candidate for president of Mexico and won 17 percent of the vote. The Alliance also won 68 seats in the Chamber of Deputies and 17 seats in the Senate.

2006 elections

In the 2006 general election, Alliance for Mexico was a grouping of the Institutional Revolutionary Party and the Ecologist Green Party of Mexico. This alliance chose Roberto Madrazo as its candidate for  president. On February 17, 2006, it extended the electoral alliance to the elections in the PAN-governed state of Querétaro, where the positions of 15 state deputies were to be elected on July 2.

References

Party of the Democratic Revolution
Institutional Revolutionary Party
Ecologist Green Party of Mexico
Labor Party (Mexico)
Political organizations based in Mexico
2000 elections in Mexico
2000 in Mexican politics
2006 elections in Mexico
2005 in Mexican politics
Defunct political party alliances in Mexico